Andrea Hlaváčková and Lucie Hradecká were the defending champions, but chose not to participate.
Stephanie Vogt and Yanina Wickmayer won the title, defeating Kristina Barrois and Laura Thorpe in the final, 7–6(7–2), 6–4.

Seeds

Draw

Draw

References
 Main Draw

2013 Doubles
BGL Luxembourg Open - Doubles
2013 in Luxembourgian tennis